Urique is one of the 67 municipalities of Chihuahua, in northern Mexico. The municipal seat lies at Urique. The municipality covers an area of 3,968.6 km².

As of 2010, the municipality had a total population of 20,386, up from 19,567 as of 2005. 

As of 2010, the town of Urique had a population of 1,102. Other than the town of Urique, the municipality had 1,214 localities, the largest of which (with 2010 populations in parentheses) were: San Rafael (2,160), Cerocahui (1,556), and Bahuichivo (1,502), classified as rural.

Geography

Towns and villages
The municipality has 857 localities. The largest are:

References

Municipalities of Chihuahua (state)